Opal is a town in Lincoln County, Wyoming, United States. The population was 96 at the 2010 census.

Geography
Opal is located at  (41.770449, -110.325918).

Demographics

2010 census
As of the census of 2010, there were 96 people, 38 households, and 28 families living in the town. The racial makeup of the town was 92.7% White, 1.0% Native American, 1.0% Asian, 3.1% from other races, and 2.1% from two or more races. Hispanic or Latino of any race were 7.3% of the population.

There were 38 households, of which 26.3% had children under the age of 18 living with them, 60.5% were married couples living together, 5.3% had a female householder with no husband present, 7.9% had a male householder with no wife present, and 26.3% were non-families. 10.5% of all households were made up of individuals, and 2.6% had someone living alone who was 65 years of age or older. The average household size was 2.53 and the average family size was 2.82.

The median age in the town was 44.5 years. 24% of residents were under the age of 18; 8.3% were between the ages of 18 and 24; 18.9% were from 25 to 44; 43.8% were from 45 to 64; and 5.2% were 65 years of age or older. The gender makeup of the town was 58.3% male and 41.7% female.

2000 census
As of the census of 2000, there were 102 people, 40 households, and 26 families living in the town. The population density was 236.8 people per square mile (91.6/km2). There were 48 housing units at an average density of 111.4 per square mile (43.1/km2). The racial makeup of the town was 99.02% White, and 0.98% from two or more races. Hispanic or Latino of any race were 5.88% of the population.

There were 40 households, out of which 40.0% had children under the age of 18 living with them, 55.0% were married couples living together, 7.5% had a female householder with no husband present, and 35.0% were non-families. 32.5% of all households were made up of individuals, and 5.0% had someone living alone who was 65 years of age or older. The average household size was 2.55 and the average family size was 3.31.

In the town, the population was spread out, with 33.3% under the age of 18, 3.9% from 18 to 24, 32.4% from 25 to 44, 24.5% from 45 to 64, and 5.9% who were 65 years of age or older. The median age was 33 years. For every 100 females, there were 100.0 males. For every 100 females age 18 and over, there were 119.4 males.

The median income for a household in the town was $38,750, and the median income for a family was $52,083. Males had a median income of $50,750 versus $0 for females. The per capita income for the town was $14,355. There were no families and 2.2% of the population living below the poverty line, including no under eighteens and none of those over 64.

References

Towns in Wyoming
Towns in Lincoln County, Wyoming